Gosh-e fil (Persian: گُوش فيل; "elephant's ear") is a fried pastry from Iranian cuisine and also popular in Afghanistan. The dough is shaped like an elephant ear (goosh), and deep-fried in oil. Each piece is then topped with chopped pistachios and powdered sugar.

This sweet is mainly served with tea, especially during Ramadan and Nowruz. 

The dough is made by whisking eggs, milk and butter, then adding the mixture to the dry ingredients.

The delicious combination of Gosh-e fil and Doogh 
The city of Isfahan is one of the prominent cities of Iran, known as the city of delicious sweets, in which Gosh-e fil is eaten with a combination of local doogh (a combination of water and sour yogurt). This delightful combination has long been rooted in the food culture of the local people and continues to this day.

See also
 List of doughnut varieties
 List of fried dough varieties  
 List of desserts

References

Pashtun cuisine
Iranian desserts
Iranian pastries
Fried dough
Afghan desserts